OSAS or Osas may refer to:
Osas Ighodaro, a Nigerian actress
Sleep Apnea - Obstructive Sleep Apnea Syndrome
Perseverance of the Saints - "Once Saved, Always Saved" (a common expression, with the relative acronym OSAS): a doctrine of Calvinist conceptions (and of Free Grace Protestant conceptions) of the Protestant Christian faith.
Overseas Scandinavian Airlines System, see History of Scandinavian Airlines System (pre-1952)